W21AU-D, virtual and UHF digital channel 21, is a low-powered Nuestra Visión-affiliated television station licensed to Orlando, Florida, United States. The station is owned by Central Florida Broadcast Company.

History

It first signed on June 23, 1989, and was previously an affiliate of the Spanish language network Azteca América from 2008 to 2012. However, in January 2012, News Corporation announced that it will launch its own Spanish language network called MundoFox, a joint venture of Newscorp's Fox International Channels and Colombia's RCN TV with W21AU as one of its charter affiliates. Currently, the channel is available in Orlando on channel 21 over-the-air. It was available on Bright House channels 94 and 909 before the channel was pulled from the provider in early 2017. On December 1, 2016, W21AU-D switched affiliations to América Tevé. On September 15, 2020, W21AU-D officially joined Mega TV, a Spanish television network owned by SBS and offers local programming produced in Puerto Rico. Two months later, the Mega TV affiliation moved to WACX-DT11.

Digital channels
The station's digital signal is multiplexed:

References

External links 
 Official site

21AU-D
21AU-D
Television channels and stations established in 1992
1992 establishments in Florida
Low-power television stations in the United States